Raqray (quechua for to slice, to crack open, Hispanicized spelling Racray) is a mountain in the Andes of Peru which reaches an altitude of approximately . It is located in the Lima Region, Canta Province, Huaros District, and in the Huarochirí Province, on the border of the districts of Huanza and Laraos. Raqray lies north of Kiwyu, northeast of a lake named Qiwllaqucha (Quechua for "gull lake").

References

Mountains of Peru
Mountains of Lima Region